Lawrence Townsend (August 13, 1860 – March 8, 1954) was an American diplomat and later in life, after his retirement from government service, a business executive in Washington, DC.

Born in Philadelphia, Lawrence Townsend was educated at Mantua Academy (1872–77) and entered the University of Pennsylvania in the class of 1881.  He withdrew from the university at the end of his junior year and went west to Plateau, Colorado, where he owned a large ranch (1881–1886).  Returning to Pennsylvania, he married composer Natalie Hannau of Philadelphia on March 8, 1886, and they had three children: Yvonne, Lawrence Jr., and Reginald.  In 1889, he went to Vienna to study law and the history of diplomacy, specializing in international law.  He published numerous translations of French and German articles in his area of specialization.

From Vienna, he launched his diplomatic career.  He served as First Secretary of the U.S. Legation in Vienna from 1893–97 and from there was promoted to the post of U.S. Minister to Portugal on June 9, 1897.  He served in Lisbon until his transfer to Brussels on April 15, 1899, where he served as U.S. Minister to Belgium until 1905.   In 1905 he moved to Washington, D.C., and joined the Washington Gas Light Company as its treasurer and later secretary.

He and his wife lived in Washington's fashionable Dupont Circle area, at 1416 20th Street, NW, and were prominent members of the Washington social and cultural scene.   Later in life, Townsend became active in the English-Speaking Union.  He died in 1954, in Florida.

References

Sources
U.S. Department of State, Office of the Historian 
The Twentieth Century Biographical Dictionary of Notable Americans.  Boston: The Biographical Society 1904 

Businesspeople from Philadelphia
1860 births
1954 deaths
Ambassadors of the United States to Belgium
Ambassadors of the United States to Portugal
People from Dupont Circle
19th-century American diplomats